César Chiffre (born April 18, 1991) is a French director and actor. He is the third generation of a family with its roots in cinema. His grandfather Yvan Chiffre was film director and stunt coordinator and his father Philippe Chiffre is production designer.

Biography
He directed his first movie at the age of 9. Chiffre has produced around fifty short films (including shorts, music videos, a 45-minute medium length movie, and has produced some thirty films to order.

In 2009, at the age of eighteen, he constructed his own camera system  to direct Produit a short film in 3D with Alexis Loizon who played the lead character.

He has also worked on visual effects for Costa Gavras’ Eden is West, and as a graphic designer on films by Eric Rochant, Fred Cavayé, Richard Berry and Guillaume Canet. He directed the ‘Making Of’ for Florent Emilio Siri’s most recent film, and has directed promotional teasers for Eloïse Lang’s forthcoming film.

Filmography

Director

Films 
 2018 : Larguées (making of)
 2016 : Invitation sur le plateau (documentary)
 2012 : Biennale de la Création des Arts Décoratifs: Paris (documentary)
 2012 : Life (short)
 2012 : Produit (short)
 2012 : Something (short)

Video clips 
 2015 : Hi'Levelz - Back
 2015 : Hi'Levelz - Pause
 2015 : Hi'Levelz - Play

Graphic Designer 
 2017 : Rock'n Roll by Guillaume Canet
 2015 : Nos Femmes by Richard Berry
 2014 : Mea culpa by Fred Cavayé
 2013 : Möbius by Eric Rochant

Actor

References

Specific

French film directors
1991 births
Living people